Aston Bay is an Arctic waterway in the Qikiqtaaluk Region of Nunavut, Canada. It is an arm of Peel Sound and is located on the western side of Somerset Island. It is located north of M'Clure Bay.

Geography
A zone of zinc-silver mineralization is located on tidewater upon a peninsula that juts into the bay.

History
There are Early Arctic Small Tool Tradition and Thule archaeological sites in the area.

References

Bays of Qikiqtaaluk Region